Jennifer Alice Clack,   (née Agnew; 3 November 1947 – 26 March 2020) was an English palaeontologist and evolutionary biologist. She specialised in the early evolution of tetrapods, specifically studying the "fish to tetrapod" transition: the origin, evolutionary development and radiation of early tetrapods and their relatives among the lobe-finned fishes. She is best known for her book Gaining Ground: the Origin and Early Evolution of Tetrapods, published in 2002 (second edition, 2012) and written with the layperson in mind.

Clack was curator at the Museum of Zoology and Professor of Vertebrate Palaeontology at the University of Cambridge, where she devoted her career to studying the early development of tetrapods, the "four-legged" animals said to have evolved from Devonian lobe-finned fishes and colonised the freshwater swamps of the Carboniferous period.

Early life and education
Clack was born on 3 November 1947, the only child of Ernest and Alice Agnew. She was brought up in Manchester, England. She was educated at Bolton School (Girls' Division), a private school in Bolton, Lancashire. She received a B.Sc. in Zoology from the University of Newcastle upon Tyne in 1970. In 1978, she accepted an invitation from Alec Panchen to obtain a Ph.D. from the same university, at the encouragement of her then new boyfriend Rob Clack. They married in 1980. Her doctorate was completed in 1984. She also held a Graduate Certificate in Museum Studies from the University of Leicester and an MA from the University of Cambridge. On 9 December 2000, she was awarded a Doctor of Science (ScD) degree by the University of Cambridge.

Academic career
In 1981, Clack joined the University Museum of Zoology, University of Cambridge, as an Assistant Curator. She was promoted to Senior Assistant Curator in 1995. Since 2005, she has been Curator in Vertebrate Palaeontology at the museum. In 2006, she was awarded a personal chair by the University of Cambridge, and took the title Professor of Vertebrate Palaeontology. She retired in 2015 and became Emeritus Professor of Vertebrate Palaeontology at the museum. In 1997, Clack was elected a Fellow of Darwin College, Cambridge; since 1 October 2015, she has been an Emeritus Fellow. From 2000 to 2005, she was Reader in Vertebrate Palaeontology at the University of Cambridge. On 1 October 2006, Clack was awarded a personal chair by Cambridge, taking the title Professor of Vertebrate Palaeontology.

Clack is best known for her extensive body of work on early tetrapods, much of which redefined how paleontologists conceived of the evolution of limbs and other features associated with tetrapods' transition from other lobe-finned fishes. She began her career working primarily on the ear of early tetrapods and later expanded to more broadly addressing the osteology and evolution of tetrapods. Together with Michael Coates (University of Chicago), Clack defined what is known as "Romer's Gap", a major gap in the fossil record of early tetrapods and one that she subsequently began to fill in collaboration with other paleontologists. Clack also undertook extensive fieldwork expeditions in order to search for further remains of early tetrapods. In 1987, during an expedition to East Greenland, Clack and her team discovered the remains of the Devonian tetrapods Acanthostega and Ichthyostega, following up on field notes of researchers who had collected material of Acanthostega in 1970. Additional surveys in 1998 led to the collection of substantial new material, including what is now recognized as Ymeria. Most recently, she led a major consortium project (TW:eed) investigating some exciting new fossils from Northumberland and the Borders Region of Scotland which date from the Tournaisian stage of the earliest Carboniferous period; this project has produced numerous publications furthering the understanding of early tetrapod evolution.

Over the course of her lengthy career, Clack published in some of the most notable scientific journals, including Nature, Science, and Proceedings of the National Academy of Sciences and is one of the most published vertebrate paleontologists in Nature, arguably the leading scientific journal in the world, with over 15 papers in that journal alone. In addition to her Gaining Ground book, Clack also co-authored a volume of the Handbuch der Paläoherpetologie series on early tetrapods with Andrew Milner in 2015 and co-edited a volume on the evolution of hearing in 2016.

Clack is probably best known for discovering that the earliest tetrapods had more than five toes per foot: the Upper Devonian tetrapods from East Greenland, Ichthyostega had seven while Acanthostega had eight (compared to the six toes of the Russian Devonian tetrapod Tulerpeton). This suggests that pentadactyly was not an ancestral trait for tetrapods.

Clack supervised many graduate students who went on to pursue successful careers in paleontology and evolutionary biology, including Per Ahlberg (Uppsala University), Paul Upchurch (University College London), Michael Lee (Flinders University), and Matthew Friedman (University of Michigan). In April 2012 she was featured in an episode of the BBC television series Beautiful Minds, a set of documentaries about scientists who have made important discoveries. This may be viewed on YouTube. Clack was honored by her peers with a festschrift published in 2019.

Death
Clack died on 26 March 2020 at the age of 72, after a five-year battle with endometrial cancer.

Honours
In 2008, Clack was awarded the Daniel Giraud Elliot Medal from the U.S. National Academy of Sciences, the first woman to achieve the honor.

In 2009, Clack was elected a Fellow of the Royal Society, the first female vertebrate paleontologist to achieve the honor. She has also been elected a Foreign Honorary Member of the American Academy of Arts and Sciences.

On 15 June 2013, Clack was awarded an honorary Doctor of Science (DSc) degree by the University of Chicago. The university described her as "an internationally preeminent palaeontologist whose research has profoundly changed the understanding of the origin of terrestrial vertebrate life." Also in 2013, she was awarded the T Neville George Medal by the Geological Society of Glasgow.

On 17 July 2014, she was awarded an honorary Doctor of Science degree by the University of Leicester. Also in 2014, she was made an Honorary Foreign Member of the Royal Swedish Academy of Sciences.

In 2018, she won the Palaeontological Association's most prestigious award, the Lapworth Medal.

References

External links
Jenny Clack on the Cambridge University website
Home page - Jennifer "Jenny" Clack
Profile on PBS website
Interview on PBS website
Jenny Clack, Paleontologist: The First Vertebrate Walks on Land on Vimeo, 2012

1947 births
2020 deaths
Alumni of Newcastle University
Alumni of the University of Leicester
English palaeontologists
Women paleontologists
Fellows of Darwin College, Cambridge
Female Fellows of the Royal Society
Scientists from Manchester
People educated at Bolton School
21st-century British women scientists
Members of the Royal Swedish Academy of Sciences
Fellows of the American Academy of Arts and Sciences
Fellows of the Royal Society